Esgarraet (from Valencian esgarradet, meaning "disrupted") is a typical dish from the Valencian community in Spain. It consists of grilled red pepper salad, cured cod, garlic, olive oil and sometimes black olives. The name derives from the preparation technique that requires to rip both the peppers and the fish in fine strips.

It is also served as tapa and is very typical for the city of Valencia. It is very popular, as the flavour of the salt cod fish contrast very well with the sweetness of the peppers and its juice that mixes with the olive oil is commonly soaked up with bread.

Variations
In Valencia this dish may be considered as a variation of espencat, another popular dish of the Valencian cuisine.
In Catalonia there is a variation that is called esqueixada which means "torn" or "ripped" in Catalan and features grilled tomato instead of red peppers.
In the central region of Castellón baked eggplant is added and all ingredients are chopped into little pieces. The recipe may also include Mojama or cod fish.

See also
 Escalivada
 Esqueixada
 List of salads

References

Spanish cuisine
Valencian cuisine
Fish dishes
Salads
Garlic dishes
Olive dishes
Tapas
Cold foods